SoftBank Tomatoh Abira Solar Park is a solar power generating station in Abira, Hokkaido, Japan. It has a capacity of about 111 MW, making it the third-largest operational solar plant in Japan.

History
Commencement of construction was marked with a groundbreaking ceremony held on 7 October 2013. Construction and engineering services were carried out by Toshiba. The plant began operation on 6 December 2015.

Facilities
The power plant comprises 444,024 monocrystalline silicon solar panels, and occupies a site of about 166 hectares.

The total capacity of the plant is 111 MW. Of this, 79 MW is supplied to the power grid.

Ownership and operations
The plant is run by Tomatoh Abira Solar Park, a joint venture between SB Energy and Mitsui & Co. The land is rented from Tomatoh Inc.

See also
 List of power stations in Japan
 Solar power in Japan

References

Energy infrastructure completed in 2015
2015 establishments in Japan
Buildings and structures in Hokkaido
Photovoltaic power stations in Japan
SoftBank Group